Ian James Gawler OAM (born 25 February 1950) is an Australian author and a prominent advocate for the therapeutic application of mind-body medicine and meditation.

Early life and career
Gawler was born in 1950 to Alan Gawler, an engineer, and Billie Gawler (née Gray) in Melbourne, Australia. After graduation from the University of Melbourne, he worked as a vet in a mixed practice at Bacchus Marsh and Melton, Victoria in 1973 with a special interest in horses and surgery.

Cancer diagnosis, treatment and criticism
In 1974 Gawler was diagnosed with osteosarcoma. Resultant surgery involved amputation through the hip. Late in 1975, it was diagnosed that the bone cancer had metastasised and spread to lymph nodes inside his pelvis and mediastinum before spreading more widely on the surface of his sternum and through his left lung.

In December 1975, with the assistance of Australian psychiatrist Ainslie Meares, who believed that meditation could alter the course of, or even cure cancer, Gawler adopted a regime of intensive meditation. He also followed a Gerson diet and pursued a program of research, introspection and personal development. In February 1976 his doctors gave him only a few weeks to live.

In February 1976, Gawler had some palliative radiotherapy; in October 1976 he underwent three cycles of experimental chemotherapy. In 1977 he also had an audience with Sai Baba. He was  declared clear of cancer in 1978. At the same time he was diagnosed with TB, which responded rapidly to conventional treatment and  supported by lifestyle-based self-help techniques. Gawler's recovery from cancer was documented by Meares<ref>Meares A., "Regression of osteogenic sarcoma metastases associated with intensive meditation", Medical Journal of Australia, 1978, p. 433.</ref> and, 30 years later, the fact that he was still alive was also documented.

In the December 2011, Internal Medicine Journal, the online journal of the Royal Australian College of Physicians, two oncologists, Ian Haines from Cabrini Hospital and Ray Lowenthal from Hobart, published a report that no biopsy of Gawler for secondary cancer had been made and suggested that all of his symptoms were consistent with tuberculosis. In response to this report, Gawler maintained that the diagnosis was confirmed by his eminent team of physicians of the day, and said that they still stand by that diagnosis. He said that Haines and Lowenthal did not consult with any of these people in preparing their speculative hypothesis and, therefore, did not take account of his clinical history or the many diagnostic tests performed and deemed to be adequate by those physicians to confirm the diagnosis. Gawler's original physicians maintain that the TB developed as a complication of Gawler's primary cancer, osteogenic sarcoma, probably after chemotherapy weakened his immune system.

Lifestyle-based cancer treatment work
After recovering from cancer, Gawler resumed work as a vet for short periods in Geelong and the Gold Coast before moving to Morphett Vale near Adelaide, South Australia, in 1978. In 1980 he then moved to a new practice at Yarra Junction, Victoria.

In 1981, Gawler co-founded the Melbourne Cancer Support Group, a lifestyle-based self-help program for people with cancer. The 12-week program was based upon Gawler's beliefs about his own recovery. Participants were taught dietary principles, relaxation, meditation, imagery and pain management skills. Other sessions included techniques to develop emotional health, the power of the mind, philosophy and the capacity to come to terms with and integrate the possibility of dying through cancer.

The program was documented in Gawler's first self-help book, You Can Conquer Cancer. In 1984, the Gawler Foundation, a not-for-profit charitable organisation, was established. The foundation conducts lifestyle-based self-help programs for people affected by cancer and multiple sclerosis, as well as meditation retreats, wellness programs and training and conferences for doctors and other health professionals.

In 1995 the Gawler Foundation published Inspiring People, a collection of the personal experiences of cancer written by 50 people who had survived "against the odds". In 2008 another collection, Surviving Cancer, was written by 28 people who had survived cancer and had attended the Gawler Foundation's programs. It was launched by  Chris O'Brien, former director of the Sydney Cancer Centre based at the Royal Prince Alfred Hospital.

Lowenthal, who  has long been a critic of Gawler's work engaged in an hour-long debate on ABC-TV show Couchman. Lowenthal challenged Gawler to produce 50 of his best cancer recovery cases for review. Gawler agreed on air and welcomed "the opportunity for some serious research". The review has not happened, despite the fact that the 50 cases were made available by the Gawler Foundation at the time. Lowenthal was reportedly unable to receive funding for the study.

Gawler worked at the Gawler Foundation as therapeutic director until 2009. He still contributes to some programs on a part-time basis.

Gawler has been a keynote speaker at many conferences, including the Royal College of General Practitioners' "Happiness and its Causes" international conference. In 2010 he received the Winsome Constance Kindness Medal for his contribution to animal welfare.

Honours
Gawler was awarded an OAM for his contributions to the community in the 1987 Australia Day Honours.

Writings
 You Can Conquer Cancer. Michelle Anderson Publishing, revised edition, 2001. 
 Peace of Mind. Michelle Anderson Publishing, revised edition. 
 Meditation, Pure & Simple. Michelle Anderson Publishing, 1996. 
 The Creative Power of Imagery. Hill of Content, 1997 (out of print) 
 Meditation, An In-depth Guide. Allen & Unwin, 2010. 
 The Mind that Changes Everything : 48 creative meditations that will enrich your life, Brolga Publishing, 2011. 
 Blue Sky Mind : The Art of Meditation,  Wilkinson Publishing, 2019. 

Personal life
In 1997, Gawler separated from his first wife, Grace Gawler. They divorced in 1999. In 2010, in response to an article in the Medical Journal of Australia about Gawler's cancer recovery, Grace Gawler disputed some of the facts and timeline regarding his recovery. 

Gawler married Ruth Gawler (née Berlin), a medical doctor, in 2000. They have worked together since 2001.

Biography
The story of Gawler's life, Ian Gawler: The Dragon's Blessing'', by Guy Allenby, was first published in 2008. The second edition was published in 2010.

References

External links
 Gawler's information website
 Gawler's blog
 Gawler Foundation website

Living people
1950 births
People from Melbourne
People educated at Melbourne Grammar School
University of Melbourne alumni
People in alternative medicine
Recipients of the Medal of the Order of Australia
Alternative cancer treatment advocates
Australian veterinarians
Male veterinarians